Caliphruria is a genus of herbaceous, perennial and bulbous plants in the Amaryllis family (Amaryllidaceae, subfamily Amaryllidoideae.) The four   species grow in tropical areas of South America, with three endemic to Colombia, but are rare in the wild. This genus is closely related with the genera Eucharis and Urceolina, all of them known colloquially as "Amazon Lilies".

Species 
The list of Caliphruria species, with their complete scientific name and authority, is given below.
†Caliphruria hartwegiana Herb., distributed in northwestern Colombia.
Caliphruria korsakoffii (Traub) Meerow, from North Central Peru. (syn.: Eucharis korsakoffii Traub.)
Caliphruria subedentata Baker, from northwestern Colombia.
†Caliphruria tenera Baker, from Colombia (Cundinamarca).

Distribution and habitat 
The genus is restricted in distribution to the Cordillera Occidental and Cordillera Central of Colombia. The species of Caliphruria are rain forest geophytes adapted to the low light conditions of the forest understory.

Conservation status 
Many of the species of the genus are endangered. Caliphruria korsakoffii, from Peru, is very infrequent;  Caliphruria hartwegiana and  Caliphruria subedentata are threatened by extinction; and Caliphruria tenera is listed as extinct.

Uses 
Caliphruria  korsakoffii and C. subedentata are cultivated as ornamental plants.

References

External links 

 Images of various species of Caliphruria from Pacific Bulb Society 

Amaryllidoideae
Amaryllidaceae genera
Flora of South America